Leslie Armstrong may refer to:

 Dr Leslie Armstrong, a fictional character in The Adventure of the Missing Three-Quarter, a Sherlock Holmes story by Sir Arthur Conan Doyle
 Dr Leslie Armstrong, archaeologist who excavated at Grimes Graves
 Dr Leslie Armstrong (d.2007), therapist who appeared on Howard 100 and Howard 101